WLCM was a radio station licensed to Lancaster, South Carolina. It operated on 1360 kHz with a power of 1,000 watts, daytime, non-directional. The call letters were chosen in honor of Springs Industries, the largest employer in the town, and represent the slogan, "World's Largest Cotton Mill."

History 

WLCM signed on the air November 26, 1951. Owned by the Royal Broadcasting Company, it broadcast from studios at 103 South Catawba Street in Lancaster. In July 1964, a sister FM station joined it when WLCM-FM 107.1 (later WPAJ) signed on (it is now WRHM).  The station became popular during the 1960s thanks to the local DJ talents of Jim Knight. The station declined after his departure. 

In 1987, WLCM and WPAJ were purchased by Our Three Sons Broadcasting, owners of WRHI AM in nearby Rock Hill, South Carolina. The new owners moved the FM to Rock Hill and sold WLCM to a broadcast group headed by former WBT announcer Bill Curry. Following the removal of its FM signal, the station was not profitable and ceased operations in 1992. The station's tower still exists and is a landmark in the town of Lancaster.

After, the protection contours for WLCM were removed, several stations improved their service areas by either changing frequencies (WADE moved from 1210 to 1340, adding nighttime service) or moving transmitter locations and increasing power (WGIV on 1370 moved from Gastonia to Pineville, and broadcasts with 19,000 watts daytime).

References

External links

 FCC History Cards for WLCM

LCM
Defunct radio stations in the United States
Radio stations established in 1951
Radio stations disestablished in 1992

1951_establishments_in_South_Carolina 
1992_disestablishments_in_South_Carolina 
LCM
LCM